Langley Park School for Girls (also known as Langley Park Girls' School, LPGS, or just Langley Girls) is a girls' secondary academy school in Beckenham in the London Borough of Bromley, England, with a mixed-sex sixth form.

The school motto is "Ad Rem Mox Nox", which roughly translates as "Time is short, get to work" or more specifically "Get it done before nightfall". In the 1960s, the official translation of the motto was "Work, for the night cometh".

Houses
The school is split into four houses in which each girl will be assigned before they officially join.  The houses are: Gamma, Sigma, Lambda and Kappa. The houses compete in a variety of event such as the inter-form Hockey/Dance/Netball/Badminton tournaments throughout the year. The houses also go against each other on sports day, which is held annually at Norman Park, although a larger emphasis is on the eight forms per year, and years themselves.

History
The building at the school's first location (on Lennard Road, Beckenham) was completed in 1914. It was however used as a military hospital during World War I.

The school itself opened on 28 September 1919 as Beckenham County School for Girls, with 153 pupils aged from 8 years, and 10 teachers. The first headmistress was Miss E.M. Fox. A few years later, an association for ex-pupils was formed, called the Adremian Association.

In 1945, the name of the school was changed to The County Grammar School for Girls, and in 1955 to Beckenham Grammar School for Girls.  In 1959, the school moved to new buildings in a parkland setting, in Langley Park. The current name "Langley Park School for Girls" was adopted in 1968.

In 1976 the school went comprehensive. In 1996 it became a technology college, and in 2000 it became part of the South East England Virtual Education Action Zone.

In July 2009, the school celebrated its 50th anniversary during the last week of school in the summer. This included music, dancing and a commemorative event - bringing the Olympic torch into the school.

On 1 August 2011, the school officially gained academy status.

Headmistresses
Miss E.M. Fox 1919-1944
Miss Henshaw 1944-1965
Miss Chreseson 1964-1966
Mrs. P. Molnar 1967-1972
Miss Grimsey (Mrs. Scales from 1976) 1973-1977
Mrs. Herzmark 1979-1993
Miss J.E. Sage 1994-2010
Dr. A. Hudson 2010-2018
Ms Katie Scott 2018 - 2022

Notable former pupils
The County Grammar School for Girls
 Alison Prince
Beckenham Grammar School
Norma Izard
Langley Park School for Girls
Ellen Gandy, swimmer
Georgina Kennedy, 2022 Commonwealth Games squash gold medallist
Kate Lawler, winner of the third series of Big Brother UK

See also
 Langley Park School for Boys

References

External links 
Park School for Girls' website
Ofsted November 2000 inspection report
Adremian Association

Girls' schools in London
Academies in the London Borough of Bromley
Educational institutions established in 1919
1919 establishments in England
Secondary schools in the London Borough of Bromley